Lata Sabharwal Seth is an Indian film and TV actress, who has worked in Bollywood films, as well. She has played supporting roles in Bollywood films like Vivah and Ishq Vishq. Lata is best known for her current role Rajshree Vishambharnath Maheshwari in Star Plus' Yeh Rishta Kya Kehlata Hai and Yeh Rishtey Hain Pyaar Ke.

Personal life
In 2009, Sabharwal married fellow actor Sanjeev Seth from the show Yeh Rishta Kya Kehlata Hai. In 2013 she gave birth to a boy.

Career
Sabharwal started her career in 1999 with Geeta Rahasya. She has played supporting roles in all three of her movies, among which Vivah has been her most successful movie to date. Besides acting in Bollywood movies, she has also acted in television series, among them Arzoo Hai Tu, Awaz - Dil Se Dil Tak, Jannat, Jhoot Bole Kauwa Kaate and Khushiyan. She usually plays supporting roles in Hindi television programmes. She was seen in Woh Rehne Waali Mehlon Ki, which aired on Sahara One channel. Then, she played the role of Sanju's mother in Shaka Laka Boom Boom. From 2007 to 2008, she played the role of Cynthia in Sahara One's Ghar Ek Sapnaa. In 2008, she appeared in Main Teri Parchhain Hoon on Imagine TV. This role got her fame in Indian Television. In 2007, she was seen in Naaginn, which aired on Zee TV, as Ratna, Triveni's daughter in law.

From 2009 onwards, she has played the character  Rajshree Vishambharnath Maheshwari, the mother of the main lead, Akshara, and the grand mother of later main lead, Naira Yeh Rishta Kya Kehlata Hai on Star Plus. She won several awards in the category of Best Onscreen Mother. She has married her on-screen husband from Yeh Rishta Kya Kehlata Hai, Sanjeev Seth. Lata and her husband, Sanjeev Seth, had participated in the Star Plus dance show Nach Baliye 6 in 2013.

She has played the role of Rajshree Vishambharnath Maheshwari in Yeh Rishta Kya Kehlata Hai and its spin-off, Yeh Rishtey Hain Pyaar Ke. She has played the role of Vasundhara Ranjeetpratap Singh in the Colors TV show Ishq Mein Marjawan. In 2021, she made an announcement about her decision to quit television.

Filmography

Television

Films

See also 
List of Indian television actresses

References

External links

 
 

Indian film actresses
Living people
Indian soap opera actresses
21st-century Indian actresses
Actresses in Hindi television
Year of birth missing (living people)